The British school of diffusionism was an archaeological and anthropological movement which believed ancient Egypt was the source of all human culture. According to this school of thought culture cannot have its origin in every parts of the world. According to them, it is only the ancient Egypt where there is favorable conditions for the origin of the culture. Hence, the British school of thought that accepts that Egypt is the place of the origin of all cultures is called "Pan Egyptian Theory".

Sources
 Raymond Scupin, Christopher R. Decorce. Anthropology: a Global Perspective.
 "Diffusionism". Sociology Guide. Accessed December 22, 2011.
 Upadhyay, Dr. Prakash, "Diffusion" in Theoretical Perspectives in Anthropology, Kshitiz Publication (2009) PP: 86–88.

Cultural anthropology
Egyptology